Cell Loss Priority (CLP) is a flag bit in the ATM cell header that determines the probability of a cell being discarded if the network becomes congested. Cells where the CLP = 0 are insured traffic and unlikely to be dropped. Cells with CLP = 1 are best-effort traffic, which may be discarded in congested conditions in order to free up resources to handle insured traffic.

CLP is used as a control for a network traffic "policing mechanism". Policing is a process that determines if the cells meet predefined restrictions as they enter an ATM network. These restrictions include traffic rates and "burst sizes" that are agreed upon by the customer and the network provider.

Link protocols